Herman and Katnip are a duo of cartoon characters, Herman the Mouse and Katnip the Cat, that starred in theatrical animated shorts produced by Famous Studios in the 1940s and 1950s. Arnold Stang and Allen Swift were the regular voices of Herman, while Sid Raymond was the regular actor for Katnip, although one or both of the characters would occasionally be voiced by Jackson Beck and Jack Mercer, respectively.

History
From 1944 to September 1950, Herman the Mouse, voiced by Arnold Stang and Allen Swift, (occasionally by Jackson Beck) was a solo star of theatrical animation shorts produced by Famous Studios and distributed by Paramount Pictures. Katnip the Cat, voiced by Sid Raymond (occasionally by Jack Mercer), made his first appearance in November 1950 with "Mice Meeting You". The two characters continued to star in animated cartoons until 1959.

In 1958, they and the other original Famous characters were purchased by comic-book publisher Harvey Comics, which continued to promote the characters under the name Harveytoons. The 1944 to 1950 Herman the Mouse cartoons (originally released as part of the Noveltoon series) were sold by Paramount in 1955 to U.M. & M. TV Corporation for television distribution.

Filmography

Legacy
Animation historian Leonard Maltin described the Herman and Katnip series as a prime stereotype of the "violent cat versus mouse" battles that were commonplace among Hollywood cartoons of the 1920s through the 1960s. The violence in this series, while intended for comedic effect, often reached a level of brutality that surpassed both Tom and Jerry, Mighty Mouse, and Warner Brothers'  Sylvester the Cat. 

All of Herman's battles with Katnip ended with Herman victorious. Only two cartoons, "You Said a Mouseful" and "Katnip's Big Day", had Katnip sharing in Herman's victory. Frequently Herman and his mouse companions would sing a victory song as they observed Katnip being brutally tortured; e.g. being eaten by sharks, killed in a rockslide while mountain climbing, strung up with Christmas lights and plugged into an electric socket, getting electrocuted by a "shock tester" machine, then flattened by it; or even dying and his ghost being warned about "the fiery furnace" in "Of Mice and Menace." It had been originally intended that Herman and Katnip would make a cameo appearance in the film Who Framed Roger Rabbit in the scene called "Acme's Funeral". However, the scene was cut out of the film. Katnip later appeared in the episode "Self Help Huey" of the animated series The Baby Huey Show as a cat redeemed by his persecutions of the past and tries that the Fox follow the same path with Baby Huey.The Simpsons writer/producer Mike Reiss insists The Itchy & Scratchy Show is based on Herman and Katnip, which he calls a "cheap, ultra-violent knockoff" of Tom and Jerry. Director David Silverman supports this, stating Herman and Katnip "is hilarious because it's just bad."

Supporting characters

Henry
Prior to his pairing with Katnip, Herman teamed up in several cartoons with the henpecked rooster Henry. Henry's nemesis is his domineering wife, Bertha (a.k.a. Chicken Pie), who makes him do all the work around the house, even saying that if she catches Henry loafing again, "I'll clip your wings and chop you down to a croquette!" Bertha is deathly afraid of mice, however: always "bawking" in shock every time Herman scares her. With Herman's help, Henry tries to manipulate Bertha into treating him more fairly ("Hey! Listen, you old hen! From now on, I'll do no more work!"). The title cards for the team-up shorts read "Featuring Herman and Henry"; the first such short was Henpecked Rooster (1944), and the last Sudden Fried Chicken (1946), in which Bertha beats the rooster hard enough to hospitalize him.

Under the new name Hector, the rooster was featured in Dell Publishing's Animal Comics #7-17 (1944–1945), with Herman as ongoing co-star, and artist Walt Kelly (Pogo) drawing several of the later stories. In Sudden Fried Chicken the cartoons also adopted the name Hector, though the "Henry" title card for unknown reasons remained unchanged.

Buzzy
Katnip also had his share of running battles with Buzzy, a singing black crow in a flat straw hat, who spoke in stereotypical "black dialect" and per historian Don Markstein was "a take-off on the gravely voice of character actor Eddie Anderson, who played Rochester on Jack Benny's show, with [Sid] Raymond (Baby Huey) as Katnip, sounding like Benny himself." Katnip's battle with Buzzy was usually based on Katnip trying to kick an ailment. He would read a rhyming verse from a medical book that suggested crow meat as the sure cure.  Once confronted by Katnip, however, Buzzy would propose another solution in an attempt to save his own skin, to which the cat usually replied, "Hmmmm, that sounds logical," but these solutions usually "failed" at the expense of Katnip, who would finally lose his patience and say, "This time, I'm doing what the book says!" This would result in a chase between the two characters--with Buzzy making occasional puns at Katnip's expense along the way--and end with Buzzy victorious and Katnip nowhere near the road to recovery. 

Buzzy the Crow was introduced in the 1946 Paramount cartoon, produced by Famous Studios, The Stupidstitious Cat. Buzzy's mannerisms and voice were based on what are now considered the offensive stereotypes of African-Americans of the time. Jackson Beck voiced Buzzy.

There were censorship issues related to Buzzy as a black stereotype. On the television series Casper and Friends, Buzzy's voice is redubbed to remove any offending content.

Buzzy also frequently appeared in Harvey Comics' Baby Huey comic books in the 1960s and 1970s, in a rivalry with a cat resembling Katnip but of a different color. Sometimes, this cat was named Katsy Cat.

Video
All "Herman and Katnip" and some Herman solo shorts have been released on public domain videocassettes and DVDs. Some prints have the U.M. & M. or NTA logo at the start and end, masking the old Paramount titles. However, the UCLA Film and Television Archive restored these shorts to their original Paramount titles.

In 1997, Classic Media issued Herman and Katnip: The Complete Series, a DVD collecting all of Herman and Katnip's appearances together. Also included were two Katnip solo shorts, Feast and Furious and City Kitty. The cartoons were presented in shortened TV prints from the anthology series The Harveytoons Show, with abbreviated opening titles, no end titles, and (in the case of Drinks on the Mouse) some censorship.

Prints of Mice Meeting You and Mice Paradise'' bear the "Featuring Herman" card as seen on Herman's solo shorts, even though these two shorts also feature Katnip.

See also
List of Herman and Katnip cartoons
Tom and Jerry
List of Tom and Jerry cartoons
Itchy and Scratchy
Squeak the Mouse
Sylvester the Cat
Little Roquefort
Dingbat and Sylvester the Fox
Pixie and Dixie and Mr. Jinks
Motormouse and Autocat
Punkin' Puss and Mushmouse
Krazy Kat

References

External links

Film characters introduced in 1944
Film series introduced in 1944
Famous Studios series and characters
Harvey Comics series and characters
Animated duos
Herman
Television series by U.M. & M. TV Corporation
Fictional rivalries
DreamWorks Classics
Male characters in animation